State Route 91 (SR 91) is a  state highway located entirely within Cullman County in the northern part of the U.S. state of Alabama. The southern terminus of the highway is at an intersection with SR 69 in Wilburn, a small unincorporated community in the southwestern part of the county that is also known as Bug Tussle. The northern terminus of the highway is at an intersection with U.S. Route 278 (US 278) in Holly Pond.

Route description
SR 91 is a two-lane highway that travels through rural areas of Cullman County. Although it is signed as a north–south highway, the first  of the highway from its southern terminus actually travels in southeasterly direction. In Arkadelphia, the highway takes a virtual 90-degree turn to the left and assumes a northeasterly trajectory, which it maintains for the duration of its length.

Our Lady of the Angels Monastery, founded by Mother Angelica, is located near SR 91 between I-65 and Hanceville.

Much of the highway between Wilburn and I-65 is a narrow winding road through hilly rural terrain. In some places, the road is actually substandard for it to be a numbered state route. However, from I-65 north and east, the roadway is substantially better and contains less sharp turns and short sightlines.

Major intersections

See also

References

091
Transportation in Cullman County, Alabama